Cem Sultan may refer to:

 Cem Sultan, Ottoman prince
 Cem Sultan (footballer), Turkish footballer
 Malkoçoğlu Cem Sultan, Turkish film